P. Rajeev may refer to:

 P. Rajeev (Karnataka) (born 1977), Indian politician from the state of Karnataka
 P. Rajeev (Kerala) (born 1967), Indian politician from the state of Kerala